Bonnie H. Cordon (born March 11, 1964) has been the fifteenth general president of the Young Women organization of the Church of Jesus Christ of Latter-day Saints (LDS Church) since 2018.

Cordon was born in Idaho Falls, Idaho, to Harold G. Hillam and Carol Rasmussen and grew up on the family’s 80-acre farm. She attended Brigham Young University.

LDS Church service
Cordon served as a full-time missionary in the Portugal Lisbon Mission. She served with her husband, Derek, while he was president of the Brazil Curitiba Mission from 2010 to 2013. She has also served in her ward and stake Primary, Young Women, and Relief Society organizations, and taught early morning seminary. 

The new Young Women general presidency was announced on March 31, 2018, during the church's 188th Annual general conference. Cordon, along with her counselors, Michelle D. Craig and Becky Craven, replaced Bonnie L. Oscarson, Carol F. McConkie, and Neill F. Marriott. At the time of her call as Young Women General President, Cordon was serving as the first counselor in the Primary General Presidency. As of August 2019, Cordon has spoken once each in the church's General Women's Meeting or general conference, with titles of Trust in the Lord and Lean Not and Becoming a Shepherd.

In her assignment on the LDS Church's Missionary Executive Council, Cordon announced the rule change granting female missionaries permission to wear pants as part of their missionary uniform. In 2018 she visited Vanuatu in her Young Women's role. In 2019 she and Lisa L. Harkness, a member of the Primary General Presidency, visited the Democratic Republic of the Congo, Madagascar, South Africa, and Mozambique.

While Cordon was serving as the Young Women General President, the church announced changes to the Young Women program in October 2019, including the retirement of class names Beehive, Mia Maid, and Laurel; having local Young Women presidents reporting directly to the bishop; a new Young Women theme; there had also been a new activity program to replace Personal Progress announced previously. In 2019, Cordon participated in the first-ever 'Sister-to-Sister' question-and-answer worldwide live event as part of Brigham Young University's Women's Conference.

Personal life
Cordon married Derek Lane Cordon on April 25, 1986, in the Salt Lake Temple and they are the parents of four children.

References

External links
Bonnie H. Cordon Official profile

1964 births
American leaders of the Church of Jesus Christ of Latter-day Saints
Brigham Young University alumni
General Presidents of the Young Women (organization)
Latter Day Saints from Idaho
Living people